The Kawasaki ZRX1200R is a standard/naked motorcycle and was manufactured in Japan from 2001 until 2007. It was sold in the US until 2005 and Europe until 2007. It was updated in 2008 with a six-speed transmission, fuel injection and was sold exclusively in Japan as the ZRX1200 DAEG model until 2016. 
It is an evolution of the ZRX1100, a stylized replica of the "Eddie Lawson Replica" KZ1000R  sold in 1982, a motorcycle made famous by the superbike racing champion of the same name. With the ZRX1200R, Kawasaki's goal was to produce a motorcycle with the performance of a modern motorcycle, while retaining a design similar to the original Eddie Lawson Replica.

Worldwide, the ZRX1200 was available in three guises: the ZRX1200S, which was partially faired; the ZRX1200R, which had a bikini fairing; and the ZRX1200C, which had no fairing. Unlike sport bikes, full handlebars made of tubular aluminum are utilized. For comfort, the saddle contains more than one centimeter of padding between the seat covering and the pan. Foot pegs are positioned similar to standard motorcycles, creating a seating position reminiscent of the classic Universal Japanese Motorcycle (UJM).

The frame is conventional steel tube with the engine supported in a removable cradle. The suspension configuration is similar to that found on a UJM. The rear shocks, designed with a piggyback reservoir, are adjustable for preload and damping. The front suspension consists of conventional forks with adjustable damping and preload. The reinforced swing arm was designed to mimic the modified/aftermarket swingarms produced in the 1970s.

The bike features a liquid-cooled 1164cc inline 4-cylinder engine. Induction comes through four 36mm Keihin Constant Velocity carburetors. The exhaust system is a 4-into-1 stainless steel unit. The exhaust system on models produced up to 2004 are painted black, with the exception of the muffler, models produced from 2004-onwards are equipped with polished exhaust systems. The "Final Edition" model have a special "Final Edition" decals, plus optional factory paint along with optional accessories such as steering damper and motorcycle lock. It was available until 2017.

Specifications

See also 
 Kawasaki Z series since 1972

Notes

ZRX1200R
Standard motorcycles
Motorcycles introduced in 2001